Culpeper Historic District is a national historic district located at Culpeper, Culpeper County, Virginia, United States.

History
It encompasses 129 contributing buildings and 1 contributing object in the central business district of the town of Culpeper. Notable buildings include the Culpeper County Courthouse (1874), Municipal Building (1928), jail and sheriff's office (1908), the Ann Wingfield School (1929), St. Stephen's Episcopal Church (1821), Culpeper Presbyterian Church (1868), Culpeper Baptist Church (1894), Antioch Baptist Church (1886), Southern Railway Station (1904), Farmers & Merchants Bank Block (c. 1900), Masonic Building (1902), Booton Building (1898), and Second National Bank (c. 1912). The contributing object is the Confederate Memorial dedicated in 1911. Also located in the district is the separately listed A. P. Hill Boyhood Home.

It was listed on the National Register of Historic Places in 1987.

References

Historic districts on the National Register of Historic Places in Virginia
Georgian architecture in Virginia
Victorian architecture in Virginia
Historic districts in Culpeper County, Virginia
National Register of Historic Places in Culpeper County, Virginia